Edwin Alexander Latham (16 October 1914 – 25 September 1982) was an Australian rules footballer who played with Footscray in the Victorian Football League (VFL).

Notes

External links 

1914 births
1982 deaths
Australian rules footballers from Victoria (Australia)
Western Bulldogs players
Kew Football Club players